Svetloye is the name of several rural localities in Russia:
Svetloye, Altai Krai, a selo in Zavyalovsky District, Altai Krai
Svetloye, Astrakhan Oblast, a village in Ikryaninsky District, Astrakhan Oblast